Noel Evans (born 14 November 1930) is a former Australian rules footballer who played with Carlton in the Victorian Football League (VFL).

Evans won the Bendigo Football League's Michelsen Medal in 1953, while playing for Sandhurst. During the year he made one appearance for Carlton, in their round two win over Melbourne at the MCG.

References

External links
 
 

1930 births
Australian rules footballers from Victoria (Australia)
Carlton Football Club players
Sandhurst Football Club players
Living people